Epipactis, or helleborine, is a genus of terrestrial orchids consisting of approximately 70 species. This genus is abbreviated as Epcts in horticultural trade.

Description
Their creeping, fleshy  rhizomes grow offshoots, from which then emerge the 20–70 cm long stems during the next spring.

There are four to eight alternate, lanceolate leaves, that grow progressively shorter near the top. The margins are entire, the top is acute. Species with less chlorophyll have blue-purple leaves.

Their bilaterally symmetrical colorful flowers grow from a terminal raceme. The three sepals and the two lateral petals are ovate and acuminate. Their color can vary from greenish-white to violet and purple.

The lip is divided in a bowl-shaped hypochile, with the outer surface greenish-white and threaded with dark veins. The wavy, snow-white epichile is fan-shaped.

The ovary is inferior. It produces a dry capsule with countless minute seeds.

Chemistry
As is characteristic of all orchids, Epipactis spp. are dependent on a mycorrhizal symbiosis (see also Orchid mycorrhiza). This allows some species to have reduced leaves and need little chlorophyll. Violet helleborine (Epipactis viridiflora) can even do without chlorophyll. These forms can be recognized by their purple instead of violet flowers.

Habitat
The species occur in temperate and subtropical climates of America, Asia, and Europe. These orchids grow in open spaces in forests, in undergrowth, on calcareous soils and are often found in wet dune-slacks near the sea. The only original American species is the giant helleborine (Epipactis gigantea). One species from Europe, broad-leaved helleborine (Epipactis helleborine), is invasive in North America. Most species are protected.

Most of these hardy orchids grow in a wet environment, but there are exceptions. The marsh helleborine (Epipactis palustris) is the only European orchid able to survive in a flooded habitat. Epipactis gigantea is a species found in the American west, and into southern Canada, in wet areas and even streams. It can grow to a height of 1 m. However, Epipactis helleborine grows in more diverse habitats, from sheltered sandy beaches to open spaces in deciduous or coniferous forests, on roadsides, in meadows, and on moist soils.  It is sometimes called the weed orchid.

Species 

Epipactis africana (Ethiopia to Malawi)
Epipactis albensis (C. Europe)
Epipactis albensis var. albensis (EC. Europe). Rhizome geophyte
Epipactis albensis var. fibri (France). Hemicryptophye or rhizome geophyte
Epipactis aspromontana (Italy) - now synonym of Epipactis leptochila subsp. aspromontana (Bartolo, Pulv. & Robatsch) Kreutz
Epipactis atromarginata (Vietnam)
Epipactis atrorubens (Hoffm.) Besser : dark red helleborine, royal helleborine (Europe to Caucasus)
Epipactis atrorubens var. atrorubens
Epipactis atrorubens var. atrata A.Waldner & Webernd (Austria)
Epipactis atrorubens subsp. danubialis (Robatsch & Rydlo) Ciocârlan & R.Rösler
Epipactis atrorubens subsp. spiridonovii (Devillers-Tersch. & Devillers) Kreutz
Epipactis atrorubens subsp. subclausa (Robatsch) Kreutz
Epipactis atrorubens var. triploidea (Gelbr. & G.Hamel) Kreutz
Epipactis autumnalis D.Doro (Italy)
Epipactis baumanniorum Ströhle
Epipactis bithynica (Turkey) - now synonym of Epipactis helleborine subsp. bithynica (Robatsch) Kreutz
Epipactis bugacensis (Hungary, near Bugacpusztaháza)
Epipactis campeadorii (Spain)
Epipactis cardina (Spain)
Epipactis condensata (Turkey to Lebanon, Cyprus, W. Transcaucasus)
Epipactis cretica (Crete)
Epipactis danubialis (Romania) - now synonym of Epipactis atrorubens subsp. danubialis (Robatsch & Rydlo) Ciocârlan & R.Rösler
Epipactis degenii (Greece) - now synonym of Epipactis halacsyi subsp. degenii (Szentp. & Mónus) Kreutz
Epipactis distans Arvet-Touvet (Central Europe)
Epipactis dunensis (Great Britain: N. England to N. Wales)
Epipactis duriensis Bernardos, et al. (Portugal) - now synonym of Epipactis tremolsii var. duriensis (Bernardos, D.Tyteca, Revuelta & Amich) P.Delforge
Epipactis exilis P.Delforge - now a synonym of Epipactis persica subsp. exilis (P.Delforge) Kreutz
Epipactis flaminia (EC. Europe) - now synonym of Epipactis greuteri var. flaminia (P.R.Savelli & Aless.) Kreutz
Epipactis flava (Laos, Thailand).
Epipactis futakii (EC. Europe) - now synonym of Epipactis leptochila var. futakii (Mered'a & Potek) P.Delforge
Epipactis gigantea : stream orchid, chatterbox, giant helleborine (W. Canada to N. Mexico). 
Epipactis greuteri H.Baumann & Künkele (Greece).
Epipactis greuteri var. flaminia (P.R.Savelli & Aless.) Kreutz
Epipactis greuteri var. preinensis (Seiser) P.Delforge
Epipactis greuteri subsp. preinensis (Austria)
Epipactis guegelii (Romania)
Epipactis halacsyi Robatsch (Greece) - now basionym of Epipactis viridiflora subsp. halacsyi 
Epipactis halacsyi subsp. degenii (Szentp. & Mónus) Kreutz
Epipactis helleborine (L.) Crantz : broad-leaved helleborine (N. Africa, Europe to C. China, Type species). 
Epipactis helleborine subsp. bithynica (Robatsch) Kreutz
Epipactis helleborine subsp. helleborine (N. Africa, Europe to C. China). 
Epipactis helleborine subsp. latina (Italy to NW. Balkan Pen). 
Epipactis helleborine subsp. leutei (Robatsch) Kreutz
Epipactis helleborine var. minor R.Engel (France)
Epipactis helleborine subsp. molochina (P.Delforge) Kreutz
Epipactis helleborine subsp. neerlandica (W. Europe).
Epipactis helleborine subsp. orbicularis (C. Europe) synonym of Epipactis distans Arvet-Touvet
Epipactis helleborine subsp. schubertiorum (Bartolo, Pulv. & Robatsch) Kreutz
Epipactis helleborine subsp. transcaucasica (Caucasus). Hemicryptophye  or rhizome geophyte
Epipactis helleborine subsp. tremolsii (W. Medit.) Hemicryptophye or rhizome geophyte
Epipactis helleborine var. youngiana (A.J.Richards & A.F.Porter) Kreutz
Epipactis ioessa Bongiorni, De Vivo, Fori & Romolini (Italy)
Epipactis kleinii (S. France to E. Spain) 
Epipactis komoricensis (EC. Europe) - now synonym of Epipactis leptochila subsp. komoricensis (Mered'a) Kreutz
Epipactis lapidocampi E.Klein & Laminger (Austria)
Epipactis latifolia All., nom. illeg. (synonym of Epipactis helleborine)
Epipactis latifolia lus. rosea Erdner - now synonym of Epipactis viridiflora var. rosea (Erdner) Kreutz
Epipactis leptochila (Godfery) Godfery : narrow-lipped helleborine (Europe). 
Epipactis leptochila subsp. aspromontana (Bartolo, Pulv. & Robatsch) Kreutz
Epipactis leptochila var. cleistogama (C.Thomas) Kreutz
Epipactis leptochila var. dinarica (S.Hertel & Riech.) P.Delforge
Epipactis leptochila var. futakii (Mered'a & Potek) P.Delforge
Epipactis leptochila subsp. komoricensis (Mered'a) Kreutz
Epipactis leptochila subsp. leptochila (Europe)
Epipactis leptochila subsp. maestrazgona (P.Delforge & Gévaudan) Kreutz
Epipactis leptochila subsp. naousaensis (Robatsch) Kreutz
Epipactis leptochila subsp. neglecta (WC. Europe). Hemicryptophyte or rhizome geophyte
Epipactis leptochila var. peitzii (H.Neumann & Wucherpf.) P.Delforge
Epipactis leptochila subsp. sancta (P.Delforge) Kreutz
Epipactis leutei (Austria) - now synonym of Epipactis helleborine subsp. leutei (Robatsch) Kreutz
Epipactis liestalensis (C. Europe).
Epipactis lusitanica (S. and N. Portugal)- now synonym of Epipactis tremolsii subsp. lusitanica (D.Tyteca) Kreutz
Epipactis maestrazgona P.Delforge & Gévaudan (Spain)
Epipactis magnibracteata (NC. China)
Epipactis mairei (Nepal to C. China) 
Epipactis maricae  (Campania, Italy
Epipactis mecsekensis (Hungary) - now a synonym of Epipactis nordeniorum subsp. mecsekensis (A.Molnár & Robatsch) Kreutz
Epipactis meridionalis H.Baumann & R.Lorenz (Sicilia to S. Italy)
Epipactis microphylla (Europe to Iran)
Epipactis molochina P.Delforge (Spain)
Epipactis moravica Batousek (Czech Republic, Slovakia, Hungary) - now a synonym of Epipactis nordeniorum subsp. moravica (Batousek) Kreutz
Epipactis muelleri (W. & C. Europe).
Epipactis muelleri subsp. cerritae (Sicilia). Hemicryptophye or rhizome geophyte
Epipactis muelleri subsp. muelleri (W. & C. Europe) Rhizome geophyte
Epipactis nauosaensis (Greece) - now a synonym of Epipactis leptochila subsp. naousaensis (Robatsch) Kreutz
Epipactis nordeniorum Robatsch (Austria)
Epipactis nordeniorum subsp. mecsekensis (A.Molnár & Robatsch) Kreutz
Epipactis nordeniorum subsp. moravica (Batousek) Kreutz
Epipactis ohwii (C. Taiwan)
Epipactis olympica (Greece)
Epipactis palustris : marsh helleborine, marsh orchid (Europe to Caucasus and Mongolia) 
Epipactis papillosa (Russian Far East to Korea, Japan) 
Epipactis persica (Soó) Nannf.  (SE. Europe to W. Pakistan) 
Epipactis persica subsp. exilis (P.Delforge) Kreutz
Epipactis phyllanthes G.E.Sm. : green-flowered helleborine (W. & NW. Europe).
Epipactis phyllanthes subsp. fageticola (C.E.Hermos.) Kreutz
Epipactis phyllanthes var. olarionensis (France). Hemicryptophye or rhizome geophyte
Epipactis phyllanthes var. phyllanthes (W. & NW. Europe) 
Epipactis placentina (Switzerland to Italy).
Epipactis pollinensis (Italy) - now synonym of Epipactis viridiflora var. pollinensis (B.Baumann & H.Baumann) Kreutz
Epipactis pontica (EC. Europe to N. Turkey)
Epipactis provincialis (France)
Epipactis pseudopurpurata (Slovakia) - Epipactis viridiflora subsp. pseudopurpurata (Mered'a) Kreutz
Epipactis purpurata
Epipactis rechingeri (N. Iran)
Epipactis rhodanensis (France to Austria)
Epipactis robatschiana Bartolo, D'Emerico, Pulv., Terrasi & Stuto (Italy)
Epipactis royleana (E. Afghanistan to Himalaya)
Epipactis sancta: Lindisfarne helleborine
Epipactis schubertiorum (Italy) - now synonym of Epipactis helleborine subsp. schubertiorum (Bartolo, Pulv. & Robatsch) Kreutz
Epipactis spiridonovii (Bulgaria) - now synonym of Epipactis atrorubens  subsp. spiridonovii (Devillers-Tersch. & Devillers) Kreutz
Epipactis stellifera (Switzerland)
Epipactis subclausa (Greece) - now synonym of Epipactis atrorubens subsp. subclausa (Robatsch) Kreutz
Epipactis tallosii (Slovakia, Hungary)
Epipactis tenii (China)
Epipactis thessala (N. & C. Greece)
Epipactis thunbergii (S. Russian Far East to Korea, Japan to Nansei-shoto)
Epipactis tremolsii Pau 
Epipactis tremolsii subsp. densifolia (W.Hahn, Passin & R.Wegener) Kreutz
Epipactis tremolsii var. duriensis (Bernardos, D.Tyteca, Revuelta & Amich) P.Delforge
Epipactis tremolsii subsp. heraclea (P.Delforge & Kreutz) Kreutz
Epipactis tremolsii subsp. lusitanica (D.Tyteca) Kreutz
Epipactis tremolsii subsp. turcica (Kreutz) Kreutz
Epipactis troodi (Cyprus, Turkey )
Epipactis turcica (E. Aegean Is. to Turkey) - now synonym of Epipactis tremolsii subsp. turcica (Kreutz) Kreutz
Epipactis turcomanica (C. Asia)
Epipactis ulugurica (Tanzania)
Epipactis veratrifolia : scarce marsh helleborine (Caucasus to Somalia and SC. China)
Epipactis viridiflora (Hoffm.) Krock: clustered helleborine, violet helleborine (Europe)
Epipactis viridiflora subsp. halacsyi (Robatsch) B.Baumann & H.Baumann (Greece)
Epipactis viridiflora subsp. pollinensis (B.Baumann & H.Baumann) B.Baumann & H.Baumann (Italy)
Epipactis viridiflora subsp. pseudopurpurata (Mered'a) Kreutz
Epipactis viridiflora var. rosea (Erdner) Kreutz
Epipactis xanthophaea (China)
Epipactis youngiana : Young's helleborine (Great Britain) - now synonym of Epipactis helleborine var. youngiana (A.J.Richards & A.F.Porter) Kreutz

Hybrids 

Epipactis × amigoi (E. helleborine × E. kleinii) (Europe).
Epipactis × barlae (E. helleborine × E. microphylla) (C. Europe).
Epipactis × barreana (E. latina × E. muelleri) (Italy).
Epipactis × breinerorum (E. helleborine subsp. helleborine × E. greuteri) (EC. Europe).
Epipactis × bruxellensis (E. helleborine × E. phyllanthes) (W. Europe).
Epipactis × capellonensis (E. atrorubens × E. latina) (Italy).
Epipactis × cardonneae (E. atrorubens × E. kleinii) (W. Europe).
Epipactis × conquensis (E. cardina × E. kleinii) (Spain).
Epipactis × gerbaudiorum  (E. provincialis × E. tremolsii) (France) 
Epipactis × gevaudanii (E. helleborine × E. rhodanensis) (France).
Epipactis × graberi (E. atrorubens × E. microphylla) (Europe). 
Epipactis × heterogama (E. atrorubens × E. muelleri) (Europe).
Epipactis x nicolosii M.P.Grasso & Grillo (. (E. helleborine (L.) Crantz x E. meridionalis H.Baumann & R.Lorenz) (Sicilia)
Epipactis × populetorum ( E. helleborine × E. hispanica) (Spain).
Epipactis × pupplingensis ( E. atrorubens × E. palustris) (Europe).
Epipactis × reinekei (E. helleborine × E. muelleri) (Europe).
Epipactis × robatschii Gévaudan & P.Delforge (E. bugacensis Robatsch x E. atrorubens (Hoffm.) Besser subvar. borbasii )
Epipactis × schmalhausenii (E. atrorubens × E. helleborine) (Europe).
Epipactis × schmalhausenii nothosubsp. fleischmannii (E. atrorubens × E. helleborine subsp. orbicularis) (Europe). Hemicryptophye or rhizome geophyte
Epipactis × schmalhausenii nothosubsp. schmalhausenii (Europe). Rhizome geophyte
Epipactis × schulzei (Europe).
Epipactis × soguksuensis(E. helleborine × E. turcica) (Turkey).
Epipactis × stephensonii (E. helleborine × E. leptochila) (Europe).
Epipactis × trikalana (E. helleborine × E. thessala) (Greece).
Epipactis × vermionensis (E. gracilis × E. helleborine) (Greece).

External links 
 
 

 
Neottieae genera
Terrestrial orchids